Osage is a city in Mitchell County, Iowa, United States. The population was 3,627 at the time of the 2020 census. It is the county seat of Mitchell County.

Geography
Osage is located at  (43.284618, -92.812129).

Climate

Demographics

2010 census
As of the census of 2010, there were 3,619 people, 1,614 households, and 954 families living in the city. The racial makeup of the city was 98.1% White, 0.2% African American, 0.1% Native American, 0.3% Asian, 0.6% from other races, and 0.7% from two or more races. Hispanic or Latino of any race were 1.3% of the population.

There were 1,614 households, of which 26.0% had children under the age of 18 living with them, 47.1% were married couples living together, 8.9% had a female householder with no husband present, 3.2% had a male householder with no wife present, and 40.9% were non-families. 36.7% of all households were made up of individuals, and 21% had someone living alone who was 65 years of age or older. The average household size was 2.16 and the average family size was 2.81.

The median age in the city was 45.2 years. 22.5% of residents were under the age of 18; 6.7% were between the ages of 18 and 24; 20.4% were from 25 to 44; 24.9% were from 45 to 64; and 25.3% were 65 years of age or older. The gender makeup of the city was 46.5% male and 53.5% female.

2000 census
As of the census of 2000, there were 3,451 people, 1,528 households, and 950 families living in the city. The racial makeup of the city was 99.16% White, 0.17% African American, 0.09% Native American, 0.12% Asian, 0.17% from other races, and 0.29% from two or more races. Hispanic or Latino of any race were 0.72% of the population.

There were 1,528 households, out of which 26.1% had children under the age of 18 living with them, 51.5% were married couples living together, 7.9% had a female householder with no husband present, and 37.8% were non-families. 34.9% of all households were made up of individuals, and 21.7% had someone living alone who was 65 years of age or older. The average household size was 2.19 and the average family size was 2.81.

Age spread: 22.5% under the age of 18, 6.7% from 18 to 24, 23.1% from 25 to 44, 19.0% from 45 to 64, and 28.7% who were 65 years of age or older. The median age was 43 years. For every 100 females, there were 84.1 males. For every 100 females age 18 and over, there were 79.5 males.

The median income for a household in the city was $30,676, and the median income for a family was $39,856. Males had a median income of $31,488 versus $22,688 for females. The per capita income for the city was $17,366. About 5.5% of families and 7.7% of the population were below the poverty line, including 8.1% of those under age 18 and 9.2% of those age 65 or over.

Attractions 
Cedar River Complex -  The Cedar River Complex (CRC) is a community recreation destination that includes an events center, wellness center, museum and auditorium. The CRC offers opportunities to meet, play, learn and enjoy. Located in Mitchell County, Iowa, the Cedar River Complex is a multi-faceted recreation facility which includes an events center, a wellness center, the Mitchell County Historical Museum and an auditorium.

Watts Theatre - The Watts Theatre was opened in 1950 by the Jim Watts family, with a showing of "Dancing in the Dark." The 44 by 132 foot building was designed and built as a state-of-the-art theater and included 580 seats and living quarters upstairs for the Watts family.
In 1994 Paul and Gloria Bunge purchased the building (which had been closed and stripped of all its equipment and seating) and restored it to its previous glory, including new heating and air conditioning, new projection equipment and a new sound system. The Bunges widened the aisles, left more room between rows, and installed 364 new seats designed for the building.
On June 14, 1994, the theater was reopened, again showing "Dancing in the Dark."
The Bunges sold the theatre in 1998 to Robert Williams and his adult children, Bethany Jablonski, Ryan Williams, and Steve Williams. The Williams family made several improvements to the theatre, including a new roof, a replacement neon system, equipment upgrades, and a complete refurbishing of the apartment (which is now used as a viewing room and party facility).
In October 2006, the Williams family sold the theatre to the Walk Family.

Education
The Osage Community School District operates area public schools.

The community formerly had Sacred Heart School, of the Roman Catholic Archdiocese of Dubuque, which opened in 1957. By 2012 it had 44 students due to consistent decreases in the student count. The school closed in 2012.

Notable people
 Margaret Stoughton Abell (1908-2004)- birthplace of first woman research forester.
 James Vincent Casey, Roman Catholic bishop
 Steve Darrell (1904-1970), actor
 Randy Duncan, football quarterback, Big Ten most valuable player and Heisman Trophy runner-up
 Hamlin Garland, American novelist, poet, essayist, short story writer, Georgist, and psychical researcher
 Edward Dean Jeffries, custom vehicle designer, stunt man and stunt coordinator.
 Mike Johanns, former Governor of Nebraska, United States Secretary of Agriculture and US Senator from Nebraska
 Gerald Leeman, 1948 Olympic silver medallist in wrestling
 Troy Merritt, PGA Tour golfer
 Doug Schwab, 2008 Olympic wrestler

See also

 Fox River Mills

References

External links

City Website
Osage Municipal Utilities

 
Cities in Mitchell County, Iowa
Cities in Iowa
County seats in Iowa